The Copa 2012 MX Apertura was the 68th staging of the Copa MX football tournament, the 41st staging in the professional era and the first played since the 1996–97 edition.

The tournament started on July 24, 2012 and concluded on October 31, 2012. In the final, Dorados de Sinaloa won the cup over Correcaminos 5-4 on penalties, after a 2-2 draw.

Participants Apertura 2012

This tournament will feature all the clubs from the Liga MX, excluding those that will participate in the 2012–13 CONCACAF Champions League (Santos, Tigres, Monterrey and Guadalajara) and 14 from the Ascenso MX (everyone except Cruz Azul Hidalgo).

Tiebreakers

If two or more clubs are equal on points on completion of the group matches, the following criteria are applied to determine the rankings:

 superior goal difference;
 higher number of goals scored;
 scores of the group matches played among the clubs in question;
 higher number of goals scored away in the group matches played among the clubs in question;
 best position in the Relegation table;
 fair play ranking;
 drawing of lots.

Group stage

Every group is composed by four clubs, two from Liga MX and two from Ascenso MX. Instead of a traditional robin-round schedule, the clubs will play in three two-legged "rounds", the last one been contested by clubs of the same league.

Each win gives a club 3 points, each draw gives 1 point. An extra point is awarded for every round won; a round is won by aggregated score, and if it is a tie, the tiebreakers should be used.

All times are UTC−05:00

Group 1

Clubs from Liga MX: León and Morelia
Clubs from Ascenso MX: Dorados and Estudiantes
Channel: TVC Deportes

Round 1

Morelia won the round 4-1 on aggregated score

León won the round 5-2 on aggregated score

Round 2

León won the round 4-1 on aggregated score

Morelia won the round 8-3 on aggregated score

Round 3

Dorados won the round 5-0 on aggregated score

Round tied 2-2. Morelia won the extra point by the away goal rule

Group 2

Clubs from Liga MX: Atlas and Cruz Azul
Clubs from Ascenso MX: Altamira and Neza
Channel: ESPN Deportes

Round 1

Altamira won the round 4-3 on aggregated score

Cruz Azul won the round 4-2 on aggregated score

Round 2

Cruz Azul won the round 1-0 on aggregated score

Neza won the round 3-2 on aggregated score

Round 3

Round tied 2-2. Altamira won the extra point by the away goal rule

Atlas won the round 2-1 on aggregated score

Group 3

Clubs from Liga MX: Atlante and Pachuca
Clubs from Ascenso MX: La Piedad and Universidad de Guadalajara
Channel: TVC Deportes

Round 1

Pachuca won the round 3-1 on aggregated score

Round tied 1-1. La Piedad won the extra point by the away goal rule

Round 2

Atlante won the round 2-1 on aggregated score

Pachuca won the round 4-1 on aggregated score

Round 3

La Piedad won the round 6-1 on aggregated score

Pachuca won the round 2-0 on aggregated score

Group 4

Clubs from Liga MX: Chiapas and San Luis
Clubs from Ascenso MX: Necaxa and Pumas Morelos
Channel: Fox Deportes

Round 1

Necaxa won the round 3-1 on aggregated score

San Luis won the round 4-1 on aggregated score

Round 2

Pumas Morelos won the round 3-1 on aggregated score

Necaxa won the round 2-1 on aggregated score

Round 3

Necaxa won the round 4-2 on aggregated score

Group 5

Clubs from Liga MX: América and Querétaro
Clubs from Ascenso MX: Correcaminos and Veracruz
Channel: TDN

Round 1

Correcaminos won the round 4-3 on aggregated score

América won the round 4-3 on aggregated score

Round 2

Querétaro won the round 5-2 on aggregated score

América won the round 9-4 on aggregated score

Round 3

Correcaminos won the round 4-1 on aggregated score

América won the round 4-2 on aggregated score

Group 6

Clubs from Liga MX: Tijuana and UNAM
Clubs from Ascenso MX: Celaya and Mérida
Channel: TDN

Round 1

Tijuana won the round 1-0 on aggregated score

Round tied 0-0. As both scores were the same, no extra point will be awarded

Round 2

Mérida won the round 3-2 on aggregated score

Round tied 3-3. As both scores were the same, no extra point will be awarded

Round 3

Mérida won the round 5-1 on aggregated score

Tijuana won the round 4-3 on aggregated score

Group 7

Clubs from Liga MX: Puebla and Toluca
Clubs from Ascenso MX: Irapuato and Lobos BUAP
Channel: SKY

Round 1

Lobos BUAP won the round 5-3 on aggregated score

Irapuato won the round 5-2 on aggregated score

Round 2

Puebla won the round 4-0 on aggregated score

Toluca won the round 5-1 on aggregated score

Round 3

Lobos BUAP won the round 5-2 on aggregated score

Toluca won the round 2-1 on aggregated score

Ranking of runners-up clubs

The best runner-up advances to the Championship stage. If two or more teams are equal on points on completion of the group matches, the following criteria are applied to determine the rankings:

 superior goal difference;
 higher number of goals scored;
 higher number of goals scored away;
 best position in the Relegation table;
 fair play ranking;
 drawing of lots.

Championship stage

The eight clubs that advance to this stage will be ranked and seeded 1 to 8. In case of ties, the same tiebreakers used to rank the runners-up will be used.

In this stage, all the rounds will be one-off game. If the game ends in a tie, there will proceed to penalty shootouts directly.
The venue will be determined as follows:

If both clubs are from the same league, the highest seeded club will host the match.
If both clubs are from different leagues, the club from Ascenso MX will host the match.

Liguilla bracket

Quarterfinals

Semifinals

Final

Goalscorers

7 goals
 Juan de Dios Hernández (Dorados)

6 goals

 Édgar Benítez (Toluca)
 Roberto Nurse (Correcaminos)

5 goals

 Aparecido Lima (Lobos BUAP)
 Martín Eduardo Zúñiga (América)

4 goals

  Antonio Pedroza (Morelia)
 Daley Mena (Dorados)
 Emmanuel Tapia (Querétaro)
 Jahir Barraza (Atlas)
 Javier Orozco (Cruz Azul)
 Jefferson Montero (Morelia)
 Danny Santoya (Necaxa)

3 goals

 Antonio López (América)
 Daniel Marquez (Necaxa)
 José Cruz Gutiérrez (Lobos BUAP)
 Juan Manuel Cavallo (La Piedad)
 Othoniel Arce (León)
 Pablo Torres (Veracruz)
 Nicolas Olivera (Correcaminos)
 Raúl Nava López (Tijuana)
 Raúl Enríquez (Tijuana)

2 goals

 Alberto Medina (Pachuca)
 Alfonso Nieto (Pumas)
 Ángel Sepúlveda (Morelia)
 Ariel González (Irapuato)
 Carlos Alberto Campos (Pumas Morelos)
 Carlos Ochoa (Morelia)
 Daniel Montenegro (América)
 David Izazola (Pumas Morelos)
 Diego Guastavino (Querétaro)
 Diego Mejía (Neza)
 Diego Ordaz (San Luis)
 Eduardo Herrera Aguirre (Pumas)
 Félix Borja (Pachuca)
 Fidel Martinez (Tijuana)
 Gustavo Ramirez (Dorados)
 Joao Rojas (Morelia)
 Jorge Mora (Correcaminos)
 Jose Maria Cardenas (América)
 Julio Cesar Pardini (Celaya)
 Luis Eduardo Rodríguez Chávez (Atlante)
 Marco Gómez (Mérida)
 Matías Britos (León)
 Miguel Layún (América)
 Oscar Fernández (Altamira)
 Roberto Nicolás Saucedo (Correcaminos)
 Santiago Tréllez (San Luis)
 Sergio Rosas (Correcaminos)
 Sonny Guadarrama (Mérida)
 Alfredo González Tahuilán (Tijuana)

1 goal

 Abraham Avalos (Irapuato)
 Addiel Reyes (Mérida)
 Adolfo Domínguez (Tijuana)
 Adolfo Rosinei (América)
 Adrián Ruelas (Veracruz)
 Alfredo Frausto (Dorados)
 Antonio Salazar (Chiapas)
 Armando Pulido (Querétaro)
 Arturo Ortiz (León)
 Brayan Martinez (Puebla)
 Carlos Balcázar (Irapuato)
 Carlos Esquivel (Toluca)
 César Morales (Altamira)
 César Villaluz (San Luis)
 Christian Giménez (Cruz Azul)
 Christián Lillo (Altamira)
 Cuauhtémoc Blanco (Dorados)
 Daniel Cervantes (Necaxa)
 Dante Garay (Pumas Morelos)
 Diego De Buen (Puebla)
 Diego Jiménez (Mérida)
 Diego Martiñones (Estudiantes Tecos)
 Eder Pacheco (Correcaminos)
 Edgar Ivan Pacheco (León)
 Eduardo Lillingston (Estudiantes Tecos)
 Edy German Brambila (Toluca)
 Emanuel Loeschbor (Neza)
 Emmanuel Cerda (San Luis)
 Emmanuel Sánchez Valdez (La Piedad)
 Erik Pimentel (América)
 Ever Alfaro (Mérida)
 Ever Guzman (Neza)
 Flavio Santos (Atlas)
 Fernando Sinecio González (La Piedad)
 Guillermo Rojas (San Luis)
 Héctor Acosta (Toluca)
 Héctor Miguel Gómez (Universidad de Guadalajara)
 Héctor Velázquez (Dorados)
 Herminio Miranda (Puebla)
 Horacio Cervantes (Necaxa)
 Ignacio del Moral (Altamira)
 Íñigo Rey (Irapuato)
 Ismael Íñiguez (Lobos BUAP)
 Ísrael Valadez (Irapuato)
 Iván Vázquez (Correcaminos)
 Jair Garcia (Puebla)
 Jesús Armando Sánchez (La Piedad)
 Jesús Isijara (Necaxa)
 Jesús Lara (Cruz Azul)
 Jesús Roberto Chávez (Puebla)
 Jorge García Carpizo (Querétaro)
 Jorge Zárate (Chiapas)
 José Antonio Rosas (Neza)
 José Francisco Torres (Pachuca)
 José Juan Vázquez (León)
 José Rodolfo Reyes (Neza)
 Josué Perea Aguilar (Irapuato)
 Jovanni Yazhin Hurtado Meza (Leones Negros)
 Juan Carlos Enriquez (Querétaro)
 Juan Carlos Medina (América)
 Juan Carlos Meza (Celaya)
 Juan Carlos Silva (San Luis)
 Juan Ignacio González (León)
 Juan José Calderón (León)
 Julio Atilano (Neza)
 Julio Gómez González (Pachuca)
 Lampros Kontogiannis (Correcaminos)
 Lorenzo Ramírez (Dorados)
 Luis Alberto Sánchez (Pachuca)
 Luis Ángel Landín (Querétaro)
 Luis Ángel Mendoza (San Luis)
 Luis Bolanos (Atlas)
 Luis Fernando Sánchez (Altamira)
 Luis Garcia Sanz (Pumas)
 Luis Nieves (León)
 Luis Orozco (Veracruz)
 Mariano Trujillo (Chiapas)
 Matías Abelairas (Puebla)
 Mauricio Romero Alvizu (Veracruz)
 Miguel Angel Herrera (Pachuca)
 Miguel Sansores (Neza)
 Nestor Diaz (Leones Negros)
 Omar Tejeda (Lobos BUAP)
 Óscar Emilio Rojas (La Piedad)
 Pablo César Aguilar (Tijuana)
 Rafael Iván Ortiz (Puebla)
 Rafael Murguía (La Piedad)
 Raúl Meráz (Pachuca)
 Richard Ruíz (Tijuana)
 Rodolfo Espinoza (Correcaminos)
 Rodrigo Noya (Mérida)
 Rodrigo Prieto (Neza)
 Rolando Sena (Correcaminos)
 Sebastián Fernández (San Luis)
 Sergio Javier Nápoles (Atlante)
 Sergio Santana (Atlas)
 Simón Steven Almeida Trinidad (Pachuca)
 Sinha (Toluca)
 Víctor Mañon (Pachuca)
 Victor Lojero (Necaxa)
 Victor Rosales (Pumas Morelos)
 Walter Jiménez (Irapuato)
 Yasser Corona (Chiapas)

Own goals
  Richard Ruíz (Tijuana) (For Celaya)
  Francisco Pizano (Puebla) (For Toluca)

Broadcast

Five television networks have the broadcasting rights. During the Group Stage, the networks will broadcast either one or two groups:

TVC Deportes: Groups 1 & 3.
TDN: Groups 5 & 6.
ESPN Deportes: Group 2.
Fox Deportes: Group 4.
SKY México: Group 7.

The broadcasting rights for the Championship Stage are shared between all the networks.

References

External links
 Official page of Copa MX (as well as Liga MX and Ascenso MX)

2012, 2
Copa Mx, 2
Copa Mx, 2
Copa Mx, 1